Durant High School may refer to one of several high schools in the United States:

Durant High School (Mississippi) in Durant, Mississippi, US
Durant High School (Iowa) in Durant, Iowa, US
Durant High School (Oklahoma) in Durant, Oklahoma, US
Durant High School (Florida) in Plant City, Florida, US

See also

 Durant (disambiguation)